The first season of the Naruto: Shippuden anime series is directed by Hayato Date, and produced by Pierrot and TV Tokyo. They are based on Part II for Masashi Kishimoto's manga series. The season is set two and a half years later, with Naruto Uzumaki and his team rescuing Gaara from the criminal organization Akatsuki. The first season aired from February to October 2007 on TV Tokyo. It was also released on DVD in Japan over eight discs between August 1, 2007 and March 5, 2008 under the name . There is also a special feature included with the seventh Naruto: Shippuden compilation DVD based on the second ending of the series called . 

The first season premiered from October 28, 2009 to April 21, 2010 on Disney XD. The season ran on Adult Swim's Toonami programming block from January 5 to August 10, 2014.

A series of eight DVDs of the season was released in North America between September 29, 2009 and April 6, 2010. The last volume also contained episodes from the second season. Viz also collected the season in three DVD boxes between January 26 and August 3, 2010, also sharing the third volume with the second season. In the United Kingdom, Manga Entertainment released it in three DVD volumes from June 14 to October 4, 2010, while a DVD box containing the first 52 episodes was released on March 7, 2011.

The series' first season used five musical themes: two openings and three endings. The first opening theme, "Hero's Come Back!!" by nobodyknows+, is used from episodes 1 to 30, while the second opening theme "Distance" by Long Shot Party, was used for episodes 31 and 32. The first ending theme,  by Home Made Kazoku is used from episodes 1 to 18, the second ending theme,  by Alüto is used from episodes 19 to 30. The third ending theme,  by Little by Little, is used for episodes 31 and 32. The first film, Naruto Shippuden the Movie, based on the Naruto: Shippuden series, was released on August 4, 2007. The broadcast versions of episodes from 24 to 27 included scenes from the film in both the opening and ending themes, while it retained the original music.


Episode list

Home releases

Japanese

English

Notes

References

General

 

Specific

2007 Japanese television seasons
Shippuden Season 1